Men's javelin throw events for wheelchair athletes were held at the 2004 Summer Paralympics in the Athens Olympic Stadium. Events were held in eight disability classes.

F52-53

The F52-53 event was won by Peter Martin, representing .

27 Sept. 2004, 18:30

F54

The F54 event was won by Luis A. Zepeda, representing .

21 Sept. 2004, 09:00

F55-56

The F55-56 event was won by Ali Naderi, representing .

22 Sept. 2004, 10:00

F57

The F57 event was won by Mohammad R. Mirzaei, representing .

25 Sept. 2004, 18:45

F58

The F58 event was won by Silver C. Ezeikpe, representing .

26 Sept. 2004, 17:00

References

M